Alluvial diagrams are a type of flow diagram originally developed to represent changes in network structure over time.
In allusion to both their visual appearance and their emphasis on flow, alluvial diagrams are named after alluvial fans that are 
naturally formed by the soil deposited from streaming water.

Interpretation

In an alluvial diagram, blocks represent clusters of nodes, and stream fields between the blocks represent changes in the composition of these clusters over time.  The height of a block represents the size of the cluster and the height of a stream field represents the size of the components contained in both blocks connected by the stream field.

Application
Alluvial diagrams were originally developed to visualize structural change in large complex networks. They can be used to visualize any type of change in group composition between states or over time and include statistical information to reveal significant change. Alluvial diagrams highlight important structural changes that can be further emphasized by color, and make identification of major transitions easy.

Alluvial diagrams can also be used to illustrate patterns of flow on a fixed network over time. The Users Flow feature of Google Analytics uses alluvial diagrams to graphically represent how visitors move among the nodes (individual pages) on a website.

See also
 Sankey diagram

References

External links

 Alluvial generator implemented in Javascript - Create alluvial diagrams from network data and export to SVG
 RAWGraphs: an open source data visualization tool - Create alluvial diagrams from dataset and export to SVG or PNG 
 Users Flow for Google Analytics

Diagrams